Adolfo Rojo Montoya (born 6 October 1965) is a Mexican politician from the National Action Party. From 2009 to 2012 he served as Deputy of the LXI Legislature of the Mexican Congress representing Sinaloa. He previously served as municipal president of Salvador Alvarado from 2002 to 2004.

References

1965 births
Living people
Politicians from Sinaloa
People from Guamúchil
Universidad Autónoma de Guadalajara alumni
Municipal presidents in Sinaloa
National Action Party (Mexico) politicians
21st-century Mexican politicians
Deputies of the LXI Legislature of Mexico
Members of the Chamber of Deputies (Mexico) for Sinaloa